7th Street station may refer to:

7th Street station (Charlotte), a LYNX Blue Line station in Charlotte
7th Street/Metro Center station, a Metro Rail station in Los Angeles